Malcolm McPhail (1895 – 1975) was a Scottish footballer who played as an outside left, primarily for Kilmarnock, with whom he won the Scottish Cup in 1920. He was selected to play for Scotland in an unofficial 'Victory International' in 1919.

McPhail later served as a director of St Mirren. He was the older brother of Rangers and Scotland forward Bob McPhail.

References

Date of birth uncertain
1895 births
1975 deaths
People from Barrhead
Sportspeople from East Renfrewshire
Association football outside forwards
Scottish footballers
Kilmarnock F.C. players
Greenock Morton F.C. players
Arthurlie F.C. players
Scottish Football League players
Scotland wartime international footballers
Scottish Football League representative players